Joel Foster Nason (August 31, 1827December 3, 1908) was an American farmer, Republican politician, and Wisconsin pioneer.  He was a member of the Wisconsin State Senate, representing the northwest corner of the state in the 1885 and 1887 sessions.

Biography
Joel Nason was born on August 31, 1827, in Crawford, Maine. He had little education in his early years, but attended an academy in Monson, Maine, and worked as a teacher before moving to the west.

He came to Wisconsin in April 1850 and settled at St. Croix Falls where he initially worked as a lumberman before cultivating a farm.  He served as a county commissioner from 1861 to 1863, and was elected county clerk in 1865, 1867, and 1869.  He was appointed receiver at the land office in St. Croix Falls in 1871, and was re-appointed in 1875, 1879, and 1883.

In 1884, he was elected to the Wisconsin State Senate running on the Republican Party ticket.  He represented the 24th State Senate district, which then-comprised most of northwestern Wisconsin—Barron, Bayfield, Burnett, Douglas, Polk, St. Croix, and Washburn counties—and served in the 1885 and 1887 sessions of the Legislature.

He died in 1908 at Osceola, Wisconsin.

Electoral history

Wisconsin Senate (1884)

| colspan="6" style="text-align:center;background-color: #e9e9e9;"| General Election, November 8, 1884

References

External links
 

1827 births
1908 deaths
People from Washington County, Maine
People from St. Croix Falls, Wisconsin
People from Osceola, Wisconsin
Republican Party Wisconsin state senators
19th-century American politicians